René Valdés  (born René Gutiérrez Valdés, June 2, 1929 – March 15, 2008) was a Cuban-born professional baseball player.

Early life and career
The right-handed pitcher, born in Guanabacoa near Havana, appeared in five games in Major League Baseball for the Brooklyn Dodgers in  during his 13-year pro career.

Valdés was acquired by Brooklyn in 1954 after spending his first two seasons in the minor leagues with the unaffiliated Indios de Ciudad Juárez of the Class C Arizona–Texas League, winning 19 games during each year. Primarily a starting pitcher, he was a prolific winner during his minor league tenure, reaching double digits in victories for ten consecutive seasons (1952–1961). He posted an 18–4 mark in the Class C California League in 1954. Then, two years later, Valdés led the Open-Classification Pacific Coast League in games won, with 22 triumphs. 

In 1957, Valdés worked in four early-season games for the Brooklyn Dodgers. In his début April 21 at Ebbets Field, he held the Pittsburgh Pirates without a hit over 3 innings pitched in relief of Dodger ace Don Newcombe. Three days later, against the New York Giants, he entered the game in the fifth inning in relief of starter Sandy Koufax and allowed three hits and one earned run in three full innings to get credit for a 4–3 Dodger victory. Two poor outings followed, resulting in Valdés' demotion to the Triple-A Montreal Royals, where he won 11 games and posted a 2.87 earned run average. He was recalled in September and started what would be the Brooklyn Dodgers' penultimate game, on the 28th against the Philadelphia Phillies at Connie Mack Stadium. He did not earn a decision when he exited the game in the fifth inning, even though he held an 8–3 lead at the time. After the Dodgers' season-ending game the next day, the franchise transferred to Los Angeles for the 1958 campaign.  

As a major leaguer, Valdés split two decisions; he allowed 13 hits, seven bases on balls and eight earned runs in 13 full innings of work, with ten strikeouts, posting an earned run average of 5.54. He toiled at the Triple-A level in the Dodger organization from 1958 through 1961, then finished his career with three seasons in the Mexican League. He died in Miami, Florida, at age 78 in 2008.

Notes

References

Further reading
 Associated Press Wirephotos (April 22, 1957). "Showing Slides". Binghamton Press.
 Associated Press (April 22, 1957). "Caution: Cutie at Work". Chicago Tribune. 
 United Press (April 22, 1957). "Thomas Fails to Rattle This Rookie". The Pittsburgh Press. p. 22
 Lacy, Sam (April 27, 1957). "From A to Z". Baltimore Afro-American. p. 14
 "Dodgers Buy Kennedy". The Pittsburgh Press. May 21, 1957. p. 28
 Nunn, Bill, Jr. (May 28, 1957). "Change of Pace". The Pittsburgh Courier. p. 27

External links

Lot 43: SALAS, Osvaldo (Cuban, 1914-1992). A large group of sports photographs. Circa 1950s. at Invaluable.com

1929 births
2008 deaths
Bakersfield Indians players
Brooklyn Dodgers players
Indios de Ciudad Juárez (minor league) players
Major League Baseball pitchers
Major League Baseball players from Cuba
Cuban expatriate baseball players in the United States
Mexican League baseball pitchers
Montreal Royals players
Portland Beavers players
Pueblo Dodgers players
St. Paul Saints (AA) players
Spokane Indians players
Sultanes de Monterrey players
Venados de Yucatán (minor league) players